Philip Scot Davidson (born August 24, 1960) is a retired four-star admiral in the United States Navy who last served as the 25th commander of United States Indo-Pacific Command from May 30, 2018 to April 30, 2021. He previously served as the commander of United States Fleet Forces Command and United States Naval Forces Northern Command from 2014 to 2018. Davidson is from St. Louis, Missouri, and is a 1982 graduate of the United States Naval Academy. He retired from the U.S. Navy effective May 1, 2021.

On April 24, 2018, the Senate Armed Services Committee confirmed Davidson to succeed Admiral Harry B. Harris Jr. as the commander of United States Pacific Command. The change of command ceremony happened on May 30, 2018. On that same day, United States Pacific Command was renamed to United States Indo-Pacific Command. When Admiral Kurt W. Tidd retired, Davidson received the title of "Old Salt", conferred upon the longest-serving surface warfare officer in the U.S. Navy. Davidson relinquished the title to Admiral Christopher W. Grady upon his retirement.

Naval career

A surface warfare officer, Davidson has deployed across the globe in frigates, destroyers, cruisers, and aircraft carriers. He also served as the commander of United States Sixth Fleet and the commander of Naval Striking and Support Forces NATO, while simultaneously serving as the deputy commander of United States Naval Forces Europe – Naval Forces Africa.

Ashore, Davidson has served in fleet, interagency, and joint tours as a flag officer; he was previously the director of maritime operations at United States Fleet Forces Command, the senior military advisor to the special representative for Afghanistan and Pakistan (SRAP) at the State Department, and the deputy director for strategy and policy in the J-5 directorate of the Joint Staff. He served earlier in his career in policy, strategy, and operations billets on multiple tours with the U.S. Pacific Fleet staff, the Navy staff, and the Joint Staff, and as the Navy’s military aide to the Vice President of the United States.

Davidson is a distinguished graduate of the United States Naval War College. He has a Master of Arts in national security and strategic studies and a Bachelor of Science in physics.

Role in the USS Roosevelt coronavirus outbreak
On March 5, 2020, Davidson ordered the aircraft carrier  to conduct its long-scheduled visit to Da Nang, Vietnam. The port call was politically important, to show United States military strength in a region increasingly unnerved by Beijing's growing territorial claims in the South China Sea. However, nearly three weeks prior, on February 14, the United States Navy had ordered all ships in the Indo-Pacific region that had made port calls to quarantine at sea for at least 14 days, the maximum incubation period for the novel coronavirus. The navy also directed the Seventh Fleet headquarters in Yokosuka, Japan to screen everyone accessing the fleet's warships and aircraft. Davidson chose to accept the risk of possible coronavirus infections, and allow the visit to proceed.

Within days of completing the port call, sailors aboard the Roosevelt began testing positive for the coronavirus. By April 13, nearly 600 sailors had tested positive, with one death, 4,000 sailors had been evacuated from the ship, and the ship's commander, Captain Brett Crozier, had been relieved of command.

Awards and decorations

References

External links

 America's Navy > Biographies > Admiral Philip Davidson

1960 births
Living people
United States Naval Academy alumni
Naval War College alumni
United States Navy personnel of the Gulf War
Recipients of the Defense Superior Service Medal
Recipients of the Legion of Merit
Recipients of the Defense Distinguished Service Medal
Recipients of the Navy Distinguished Service Medal
United States Navy admirals